Hey Joe! Hey Moe! is an album by country singers Moe Bandy and Joe Stampley, released in 1981 on the Columbia label recorded and mastered at the CBS Recording Studios, Nashville, Tennessee.

Track listing
"Honky Tonk Queen" (Robbie Lee Hicks) - 2:40
"The Girl Don't Ever Get Lonely" (Bobby Fischer, Christopher "Sky Juice" Blake) - 2:30
"I'd Rather Be A-Pickin'" (Dan Darst) - 2:14
"Drinkin', Dancin'" (Warren Robb, Shirl Milete) - 2:08
"Drunk Front" (Paul Craft, Tim Krekel) - 2:26
"Hey Joe (Hey Moe)" (Boudleaux Bryant) - 2:16
"Country Boys" (Warren Robb, Dave Kirby) - 2:16
"Let's Hear It For The Workin' Man" (Max D. Barnes) - 2:11
"Get Off My Case" (Dan Mitchell) - 2:38
"Two Beers Away" (Johnny Gimble) - 2:21

Musicians
Hargus "Pig" Robbins
Leo Jackson
Weldon Myrick
Johnny Gimble
Henry Strzelecki
Charlie McCoy
Jerry Carrigan
Dave Kirby
Ray Edenton
Ray Norman
John Komrada
Wayne Harrison
Pete Wade
Mike Leech

Backing
The Jordanaires with Laverna Moore.

Production
Sound engineers - Billy Sherrill at Sound Emporium, Lou Bradley, Ron Reynolds
Photography - Larry Dixon

1981 albums
Moe Bandy albums
Joe Stampley albums
Columbia Records albums
Albums produced by Ray Baker (music producer)